Watersheds of North America are large drainage basins which drain to separate oceans, seas, gulfs, or endorheic basins.  There are six generally recognized hydrological continental divides which divide the continent into seven principal drainage basins spanning three oceans (Arctic, Atlantic and Pacific) and one endorheic basin. The basins are the Atlantic Seaboard basin, the Gulf of Mexico basin, the Great Lakes-St. Lawrence basin, the Pacific basin, the Arctic basin, the Hudson Bay basin, and the Great Basin. Together, the principal basins span the continent with the exception of numerous smaller endorheic basins.

The Atlantic Seaboard basin in eastern North America drains to the Atlantic Ocean; the Great Lakes-St. Lawrence basin in central and eastern North America drains to the Gulf of St. Lawrence on the Atlantic Ocean or to the Labrador Sea; the Gulf of Mexico basin in the southern United States drains to the Gulf of Mexico, a basin of the Atlantic Ocean; the Pacific basin in western North America drains to the Pacific Ocean or the Gulf of California on the Pacific Ocean; the Arctic basin in northwestern North America drains to the Beaufort Sea of the Arctic Ocean or directly to the Arctic Ocean; the Hudson Bay basin in central northern North America drains to Hudson Bay on the Labrador Sea (which may be considered part of either the Arctic Ocean or Atlantic Ocean), or to the Arctic Sea via Foxe Basin and Fury and Hecla Strait; the Great Basin in western United States is an endorheic basin which does not drain to any ocean.

The Atlantic Seaboard basin is bounded by the Atlantic Ocean to the east, the Eastern Continental Divide to the west, the Great Lakes-St. Lawrence Divide to the north, and the Lake Okeechobee endorheic basin to the south.  The Gulf of Mexico basin is bounded by the Gulf of Mexico to the south, the Eastern Continental Divide to the east, the Great Lakes-St. Lawrence Divide to the northeast, the Laurentian Divide to the North, and the Continental Divide to the west. The Pacific Basin is bounded by the Continental divide to the east and Pacific Ocean to the west; the basin excludes the endorheic Great Basin in the west. The Great Basin has a closed loop boundary encompassing substantially all of Nevada, the western half of Utah and parts of Oregon, California, Idaho, and Wyoming.

Endorheic basins

Most lakes are not actually endorheic, but endorheic basins may not have standing water, or have water only seasonally. The most significant endorheic basins are these:
Great Basin covering most of Nevada, the western part of Utah, and smaller amounts of other U.S. states
Great Divide Basin on the Continental Divide in Wyoming
Guzmán Basin
Badwater Basin, Death Valley, California (no standing water)
Bolsón de Mapimí
Llanos el Salado

Boundary landforms
The western boundary (Eastern Continental Divide) of the Atlantic Seaboard basin and eastern boundary of the Gulf of Mexico basin is formed by the Appalachian Mountains to the North, the Piedmont Plateau and lowland ridges of the Atlantic Coastal plain to the south.
The eastern boundary of the Pacific basin and western boundary of the Gulf of Mexico basin (Continental Divide) is the Rocky Mountains.

Principal rivers of basins
A principal river of a basin is a river that drains directly to the incident ocean, sea or gulf, or into an endorheic basin.

Great Lakes-St. Lawrence basin
 St. Lawrence River

Atlantic Seaboard basin
 Susquehanna River
 Hudson River
 Savannah River
 Delaware River
 Potomac River
 Connecticut River

Gulf of Mexico basin 
 Mississippi River
 Brazos River
 Rio Grande
 Grijalva River
 Usumacinta River

Arctic basin
 Mackenzie River
 Yukon River

Hudson Bay basin

 Churchill River
 Nelson River

Pacific basin
 Colorado River
 Columbia River
 Fraser River
 Sacramento River
 Klamath River
 Balsas River
 Lerma River

Great Basin
 Bear River
 Humboldt River

References
 Canadian Encyclopedia, "Drainage Basin"